Parliamentary Bureau may refer to:

 Bureau (European Parliament)
 Parliamentary Bureau of the Scottish Parliament